Thelocarpaceae is the sole family of lichen-forming fungi in the order Thelocarpales. The family contains two genera, Sarcosagium and Thelocarpon. The family was circumscribed by lichenologist Hugo Zukal in 1893, while the order was proposed by Robert Lücking and H. Thorsten Lumbsch in 2016.

Genera
 Sarcosagium  – 1 sp.
 Thelocarpon   – 25 spp.

References

Ascomycota
Ascomycota enigmatic taxa
Ascomycota families
Lichen families
Taxa described in 1893
Taxa named by Hugo Zukal